Delyan is a village in Dupnitsa Municipality, Kyustendil Province, south-western Bulgaria.

References

Villages in Kyustendil Province